Bartolomeu de Quental, C.O. (22 August 1626 – 20 December 1698) was a Portuguese Catholic priest, theologian, and distinguished preacher. Quental was the founder of the first Congregation of the Oratory of Saint Philip in Portugal in 1668.

The cause for his canonisation was officially opened in around 1720. In 1748, Pope Benedict XIV officially recognised that Quental lived a life of "heroic virtue", and he has since been referred to as "venerable", although the cause for his beatification has lain dormant since the time of the Marquis of Pombal and the weakening of the Congregation of the Oratory in Portugal.

Early life
Bartolomeu de Quental was born in Fenais da Luz, in São Miguel Island, in the Azores, on 22 August 1627. He was the son of Francisco de Andrade Cabral and of Ana de Quental Novais. He was baptised in the Parish of Our Lady of Light (Nossa Senhora da Luz) and was named "Bartolomeu" due to the proximity of the feast day of Saint Bartholomew the Apostle. The family was devoutly Catholic. He was an accomplished student as a young man; he had a firm grasp of Latin and at the age of twelve, ahead of his peers, he concluded his studies of grammar. According to the custom of the time, it befell on the first-born – in this case, his older brother Pedro de Matos de Quental – to pursue further studies, which meant Bartolomeu would not be able to travel to Mainland Portugal to study Philosophy as he wished; however, at the last moment, his brother gave up on this plan to give him the opportunity. Bartolomeu arrived in Lisbon at the age of 16, travelling to Évora to enroll in the Royal College of Arts (Real Colégio das Artes) of the Jesuit-run University of Évora. He achieved the degree of Artium Magister in 1647, having studied under Fr. Diogo Fernandes, one of the most distinguished professors in Évora.

He then achieved the highest possible grade in his bachelor's degree and, later, in 1647, achieves a licentiate degree in Philosophy. The following year, he concludes his doctorate in the same field. He enrolls in Theology around the same time and, in 1650, goes to the University of Coimbra. Already a deacon, he became a preacher of considerable merit, and soon was receiving invitations to preach at solemn occasions at court. At this time, he was considered the second-best public speaker in the kingdom, after the Jesuit António Vieira.

He was ordained a priest in 1652, by D. Francisco de Sotomayor, Titular Bishop of Targa (Auxiliary Bishop of Lisbon), at the Church of the Holy Spirit of the Quarry (Espírito Santo da Pedreira). The two following years he had an active pastoral activity throughout the archdiocese, travelling the cities and towns to have a direct understanding of the needs of the people. In 1654, he petitioned the king for the position of parish priest of the Church of Our Lady of the Star (Nossa Senhora da Estrela) in Ribeira Grande, near his hometown, as it was vacant; he was appointed for the position but shortly afterward resigned: biographers posit this was due to an increasing interest in missionary work, which was incompatible with the position of a parish priest.

Court preacher
On 22 October 1654, King John IV named Fr. Bartolomeu de Quental a "supranumerary preacher" of the Royal Chapel, and a Chaplain-Confessor of the Royal Household. The appointment was surprising, even though he was by now famous around Lisbon for his learned sermons, as the energic priest was only 27.

A virtuous spiritual director, Quental was a popular chaplain and confessor at court: his sermons were well-attended and the noble ladies at court attended his morning prayers and his nightly spiritual exercises. His efforts to reform the mores at court were well-succeeded, with many remarking that, at the time, the virtue and religious devotion of Queen Luisa de Guzmán's ladies-in-waiting was the envy of many nunneries around the kingdom. Among the regular attendees at Bartolomeu de Quental's functions was the Infanta Catherine of Braganza, later Queen consort of England, whose devotion to the Roman Catholic faith in which she had been raised would make her unpopular in England.

Origins of the Congregation of the Oratory

Portugal was, at the time, waging a long and economically straining war against Spain since John, Duke of Braganza, had led a revolution in 1640 that ousted the ruling Habsburg monarch, Philip IV of Spain, and put an end to the Spanish rule over Portugal of the Iberian Union. Quental's reforming zeal derived from the conscience of this difficult national context, which resulted in a lack of preparation of the clergy, as well as a lack of conditions for them to exercise their priestly munus with the proper dignity.

Between 1657 and 1658, Quental tried to gather all chaplains and clergy of the Royal Chapel in a small community of "priests who are devout and zealous of the salvation of souls, so that, through their example, would attract the people to their spiritual exercises", not without much resistance. In 1659, he managed to institute a confraternity under the patronage of Our Lady of Saudades, which was approved by decree of Queen Luisa de Guzmán, on 18 February 1659, with a particular focus on the practice of the works of mercy.

Meanwhile, in 1664, Quental stepped down from his role of court confessor to focus on his missionary work with the poor, around the rural areas of the archdiocese: "He rose at the break of down and immediately engaged in mental prayer and mass. After a light meal, he went to the confessional, where he spent nearly all day hearing innumerable penitents. Late in the afternoon, after the Vespers' bell, he climbed to the pulpit, where he preached and rounded off the day with collective prayer. His schedule, sometimes, was so full that he often ended up sleeping in churches or churchyards, draped only in his cape."

The political intrigue of the time, during the reign of King Afonso VI, may also have been a contributing factor for Quental's departure from court. Taking advantage of his proximity with the queen, Quental had harshly criticised the young king for his excesses and unbecoming public behaviour in his sermons; when his brother, Infante Peter (later, King Peter II) had Afonso deemed incapable of ruling and assumed power as regent in 1668, Quental was invited back to the Royal Chapel, but refused. Instead, drawing on the popularity and on the successful model of his Confraternity of Our Lady of Saudades, his new project was to institute a formal congregation, inspired by the Congregation of the Oratory that had been established in Rome in 1575 by Saint Philip Neri. He asked formal permission to the Chapter of the See of Lisbon (which was vacant at the time), and received it on 8 January 1668; the royal authorisation came on 23 March 1668.

Quental's statutes drew inspiration from both the Italian Oratorians (which communities were all independent and autonomous in their action) and the French Oratorians (founded in 1611 by Pierre de Bérulle, which operated under a tighter organisational structure, under the authority of a Superior-General): like the Italians, the Portuguese congregation stressed the practice of charity, of prayer, the restriction of excessive mortification, and the lack of formal vows, but shared a somewhat more centralised form of governance like the French (while reserving some degree of autonomy to the individual communities). The statutes were finally recognised by Pope Clement X, though the brief Ex injuncto nobis, on 24 August 1672.

Death and legacy
Bartolomeu de Quental died on 20 December 1698, with a reputation for sanctity. Following the death of their founder, the Oratorian Fathers attempted to advance the cause for his canonisation: it was officially opened in around 1720.

The Oratorians took advantage of the fact that Bartolomeu de Quental had been a preacher and confessor at court, to secure the support from the throne for their endeavours. In 1733, Fr. António de Ataíde is sent to Rome with the purpose of negotiating the cause for beatification. It is around this time that Fr. José Catalano writes Quental's first biography, De Vita Venerabilis Bartholomaei de Quental, dedicated to King John V (translated to Portuguese by Cândido Lusitano in 1741, under the title Vida do Venerável Padre Bartolomeu de Quental). Ataíde dies and is replaced as postulator by Luís António Verney; in 1740 he is relieved by two Oratorian Fathers sent to Rome by King John V, but is once again charged with the cause for beatification after their deaths.

In 1748, Pope Benedict XIV officially recognised that Quental had lived a life of "heroic virtue" – a major step towards beatification – and he has since been referred to as "Venerable", although the cause for his beatification has lain dormant since the time of the Marquis of Pombal in the second half of the 18th century, and the subsequent waning influence of the Congregation of the Oratory in Portugal.

References

1626 births
1698 deaths
17th-century Portuguese people
17th-century venerated Christians
Oratorians
Portuguese Roman Catholic theologians